Dioryctria postmajorella is a species of snout moth in the genus Dioryctria. It was described by Herbert H. Neunzig in 1996 and is known from the Dominican Republic.

The length of the forewings is 12–15 mm. The ground colour of the forewings is grey, while the hindwings are pale fuscous, but darker along the veins and wing margins.

The larvae possibly feed on Pinus occidentalis.

Etymology
The name refers to the similarity with Dioryctria majorella.

References

Moths described in 1996
postmajorella